Réka Tuss (born 17 July 1977) is a Hungarian alpine skier. She competed in two events at the 2006 Winter Olympics.

References

External links
 

1977 births
Living people
Hungarian female alpine skiers
Olympic alpine skiers of Hungary
Alpine skiers at the 2006 Winter Olympics
Skiers from Budapest